Gwa Township is a township of Thandwe District in Rakhine State, Myanmar. The principal town is Gwa.

References

Townships of Rakhine State